Royal Air Force Swingate Down or more simply RAF Swingate Down is a former Royal Air Force Chain Home Low radar station operational during the Second World War located north of Dover, Kent, England.

The site was situated on alongside RAF Dover, another Radar section together on the removed First World War landing ground of RAF Dover.

History

First World War
RAF Dover was first established during August 1913, initially as stopping-off point before flying over the English Channel to France and was used by the following units:
 No. 2 Squadron RAF
 No. 3 Squadron RAF
 No. 4 Squadron RAF
 No. 5 Squadron RAF
 No. 7 Squadron RAF
 No. 9 Squadron RAF 
 No. 12 Reserve Aeroplane Squadron RAF 
 No. 13 Reserve Aeroplane Squadron RAF became No. 13 Reserve Squadron RAF became No. 13 Training Squadron RAF
 No. 15 Squadron RAF
 No. 20 Reserve Squadron RAF
 No. 27 Squadron RAF
 No. 49 Squadron RAF
 No. 50 Squadron RAF
 No. 58 Squadron RAF
 No. 62 Training Squadron RAF
 No. 64 Reserve Squadron RAF
 No. 65 Training Squadron RAF became No. 53 Training Depot Station RAF
 No. 110 Squadron RAF
 No. 212 Squadron RAF
 Machine Gun School

Second World War
RAF Dover was re-established as a Chain Home radar station during 1938.

RAF Swingate Down was located to the east of RAF Dover but within the confines of the old landing ground as Chain Home Low radar station.

Current use

The site is a transmitting station.

References

Citations

Bibliography

Swingate Down